Dick Rienstra (Assen, 1941 – 2021) was a Dutch singer and actor.

Rienstra began his musical career in a local group, The Double S Combo, where he sang and played guitar, clarinet, and saxophone. In 1960 he debuted on the radio in a KRO program, and in 1962 on the TV, in a VARA talent show. He moved to Amsterdam in 1963 and got a job in a musical comedy production as a singer and an actor in skits, and in 1966 signed with the Snip en Snap Revue. With the Amsterdams Volkstoneel he performed in the musical De Jantjes, and later formed a musical duo called De Jantjes as well. He was a contender in the preliminaries for the Eurovision Song Contest in 1977, and after that performed in the theater and in minor roles on television. He played a role in the comedy film Flodders in America (1992) and played the lead in the EO drama series De laatste carrier (1994).

Filmography

References

External links

1941 births
2021 deaths
Dutch male singers
People from Assen
Nationaal Songfestival contestants